Gordon Brown (born 21 October 1979) is a Scottish former professional footballer who played as a midfielder. Born in Broxburn, Brown played in the Scottish Football League for St Johnstone and East Fife, making a total of 18 appearances.

References

External links

1979 births
Living people
Scottish footballers
St Johnstone F.C. players
East Fife F.C. players
Scottish Football League players
Association football midfielders
Sportspeople from Broxburn, West Lothian
Footballers from West Lothian